Hawa Mahal (Hindi: हवा महल, translation: "Palace of Winds" or “Palace of Breezes”), is a popular nightly radio show in India broadcast on the Vividh Bharati service. It has a skit-format, where stories from various writers were dramatized into plays. Along with some other shows like Modi ke matwale rahi,  Hawa Mahal was one of the few programs that was suitable for spot advertising on Indian radio, which often led to commercial spots on the program being in high-demand and sold-out six-months in advance..The time slot for the program is 8 pm.

References

Indian radio programmes
All India Radio
Radio dramas
Hindi-language radio programs